Neue Volksmusik (sometimes also called Volxmusik or Tradimix; English for "New folk music") describes the crossover mix of traditional German folk music (Volksmusik) with newer genres such as jazz, contemporary folk, electronic music, and/or rock.

References

Popular music
German folk music